The Lava Formation is a Mesozoic geologic formation in Lithuania and Kaliningrad, being either the sister or the same unit as the Ciechocinek Formation. It represents the outcrop of Lower Toarcian layers in the Baltic Syncline and in the Lithuanian-Polish Syneclise (C8-borehole in Gdańsk Bay). It is known by the presence of Miospores and Pollen, as well Plant remains. The formation contains grey, greenish, and dark grey silt and clay with interealatians and lenses of fine-grained sand, pyritic concretions and plant remains (carbonised wood fragments). The Jotvingiai Group Toarcian deposits represent deposits laid down in fresh water and brackish basins, possibly lagoons or coastal plain lakes. The Bartoszyce IG 1 of the Ciechocinek Formation shows how at the initial phase of the Toarcian there was a regional transgression in the Baltic Syncline, indicated by greenish-grey mudstones, heteroliths and fine-grained sandstones with abundant plant fossils and plant roots, what indicates a local delta progradation between the Lava and Ciechocinek Fms. Then a great accumulation of miospores (+2500 specimens) indicates a local concentration, likely due to a rapidly decelerating fluvial flow in a delta-fringing lagoon forming a “hydrodynamic trap”, with the wave and currents stopping the miospores to spread to the basin. Latter a marsh system developed with numerous palaeosol levels, being overlayed by brackish-marine embayment deposits that return to lagoon-marsh facies with numerous plant roots (Radicites sp) and palaeosol levels in the uppermost section, ending the succession. Overall the facies show that the local Ciechocinek-Lava system was a sedimentary basin shallow and isolated, surrounded by a flat coastal/delta plain with marshes, delivering abundant spores and Phytoclasts, indicators of proximal landmasses with high availability of wood and other plant material.
This climate at the time of deposition was strongly seasonal, probably with monsoonal periods. Due to the abundant presence of deltaic sediments  on the upper part, it is considered to be related to the retry of the sea level. The Lava Formation was deposited on a mostly continental setting, with its upper part, dominated by argillaceous sediments, corresponding to the Ciechocinek Formation.  There is a great amount of kaolinite content, being present laterally in the basin, decreasing and lifting space to increasing smectite to the south-west of the formation. On the other hand, there is a great amount of coarsest sediments, which consist mostly of sands.



Palynology

Megaflora

See also 
 List of fossiliferous stratigraphic units in Lithuania
 Toarcian turnover
 Toarcian formations
Marne di Monte Serrone, Italy
 Calcare di Sogno, Italy
 Mizur Formation, North Caucasus
 Djupadal Formation, Central Skane
 Sachrang Formation, Austria
 Saubach Formation, Austria
 Posidonia Shale, Lagerstätte in Germany
 Ciechocinek Formation, Germany and Poland
 Krempachy Marl Formation, Poland and Slovakia
 Azilal Group, North Africa
 Whitby Mudstone, England
 Fernie Formation, Alberta and British Columbia
 Poker Chip Shale
 Whiteaves Formation, British Columbia
 Navajo Sandstone, Utah
 Los Molles Formation, Argentina
 Mawson Formation, Antarctica
 Kandreho Formation, Madagascar
 Kota Formation, India
 Cattamarra Coal Measures, Australia

References

Further reading
 Weishampel, David B.; Dodson, Peter; and Osmólska, Halszka (eds.): The Dinosauria, 2nd, Berkeley: University of California Press. 861 pp. .

Geologic formations of Lithuania
Jurassic System of Europe
Toarcian Stage
Sandstone formations
Shale formations
Open marine deposits
Fossiliferous stratigraphic units of Europe
Paleontology in Lithuania